The "Baby Jessica" case was a highly publicized custody battle in Ann Arbor, Michigan in the early 1990s between Jan and Roberta DeBoer, the couple who attempted to adopt the child, and her biological parents, Daniel Schmidt and Cara Clausen. In August 1993, the supreme courts of Iowa and Michigan ordered her returned to Schmidt, who named her Anna Jacqueline Schmidt. The case was widely publicized as the "Baby Jessica" case after the name given her by the DeBoers. The case name is In re Clausen 442 Mich. 648 (1993).

Overview
Anna was born in 1991 to 29 year old  Cara Clausen, who placed her for adoption with Jan and Roberta DeBoer without telling Schmidt that he was the father.  She also put a different man's name on the birth certificate, further obscuring paternity. The adoption process was handled by the DeBoers' attorney, whom Clausen erroneously thought was also her attorney. Five days after the birth, Clausen changed her mind, informed Schmidt of his paternity, and told the DeBoers that she wanted to cancel the adoption.

Clausen had already relinquished her parental rights so there was nothing that she could do.  But Schmidt had not relinquished his parental rights so he could and did stop the adoption proceedings. The DeBoers, however, believing that the most important issue was the best interest of the child, rather than parental rights, attempted to complete the adoption.

Clausen and Schmidt, who were married in 1992, continued in the courts to get the child returned to them. The DeBoers, who had named the baby "Jessica," battled to keep the child for two and a half years, but ultimately lost. The Iowa Supreme Court noted Daniel had from previous relationships, two children whom he largely failed to financially support and with whom he failed to maintain meaningful contact.

Because the adoption process had never been completed, the Michigan court decided to give full faith and credit to the sister state judgment from Iowa and order child to be returned to her biological parents. Anna had several visitations with her biological parents before the transfer. Newspapers showed photographs of a screaming toddler being taken from the DeBoers and transferred to the Schmidts.

A child psychoanalyst supervised the transition to the Schmidt home. She reported that "her adjustment has been so unexpectedly good that I give the Schmidts and the DeBoers a lot of credit." And, a year after the transfer, said, "Everyone guaranteed—guaranteed—that she would have short-term trauma, that she wouldn't eat, wouldn't sleep, she'd cry. It didn't happen. She progressed rapidly."

Roberta "Robby" DeBoer later wrote a book called Losing Jessica about the case, and the DeBoers established a child group called Hear My Voice that advocated for children involved in difficult custody cases, with a pro-adoptive parent angle.

The DeBoers adopted a newborn boy in 1994, nine months after returning Anna. In 1999 they divorced, and although they remarried, they divorced again. The Schmidts divorced close to the same time as the DeBoers. They went on to share custody of Anna and their second daughter.

Anna said in 2003 that she has no memory of the DeBoers and was doing well with her biological family.

Film portrayal 
A TV movie dramatizing the events, Whose Child Is This? The War for Baby Jessica was produced, but was criticized by some for being biased in favor of the DeBoers. In the film, the DeBoers, who were better educated than the Schmidts and had a better financial position, were portrayed as an affluent, ideal family for the child, while the Schmidts were portrayed as unsuitable parents.

See also
 Baby Richard case
 Adoption in the United States
 Adoption fraud
Adoptive Couple v. Baby Girl

References

Further reading

External links
 "The Ties That Traumatize", April 12, 1993 Time magazine article about the Baby Jessica case.
 "The War for Baby Clausen", March 22, 1993 The New Yorker magazine article about the Baby Jessica case.

United States family case law
Adoption law in the United States
1993 in Michigan
Trials regarding custody of children
Iowa state case law
Michigan state case law